Katie Tsuyuki (born March 4, 1982) is a Canadian snowboarder. She competes in half-pipe and represented Canada in this event at the 2014 Winter Olympics in Sochi.

References

1982 births
Living people
Canadian female snowboarders
Snowboarders at the 2014 Winter Olympics
Olympic snowboarders of Canada
Sportspeople from Scarborough, Toronto
Canadian sportspeople of Japanese descent